María Núñez Nistal (born 27 November 1988) is a Spanish handball player for ESBF Besançon and the Spanish national team.

She represented Spain at the 2019 World Women's Handball Championship.

References

External links

1988 births
Living people
Spanish female handball players
People from Mogán
Sportspeople from the Province of Las Palmas
Expatriate handball players
Spanish expatriate sportspeople in France